The men's C-2 1000 metres canoeing event at the 2019 Pan American Games was held on 27th of July at the Albufera Medio Mundo in the city of Huacho.

Results

Final

References

External links
Results

Canoeing at the 2019 Pan American Games